Puttegga or Pyttegga is the highest mountain in Møre og Romsdal county, Norway. It lies on the border of Fjord Municipality and Rauma Municipality. The nearest village is Tafjord,  to the west. The mountain is easily accessed from the cabin Pyttbua to the east, which is maintained by the Norwegian Trekking Association.

Name
The first element is putt or pytt, meaning "puddle" or "small lake". The last element is the finite form of egg which means "edge" or "mountain ridge". The edge is surrounded by several small lakes.

See also
 List of highest points of Norwegian counties

References

Mountains of Møre og Romsdal
Fjord (municipality)
Rauma, Norway
Highest points of Norwegian counties
One-thousanders of Norway